Bozalqanlı may refer to:
Bozalqanlı (Bozalganly), Azerbaijan
Bozalqanlı (Boz Bozalganly), Azerbaijan